Antonello Bonci is an Italian-American neurologist and a neuropsychopharmacologist specialized in the long-term effects of drug exposure on the brain. In August 2019, he became president of Global Institutes on Addictions Miami. Bonci was previously the scientific director of the National Institute on Drug Abuse and a professor at the University of California, San Francisco.

Education

In 1985, Bonci went to Medical School at the Università Cattolica del Sacro Cuore, where he graduated cum laude in 1991. In that same year, he started a Residency in Neurology at the University of Rome Tor Vergata where he graduated cum laude in 1995.

Career

Bonci became assistant professor in Residence at the University of California, San Francisco in 1999. He became Associate Professor in Residence in 2004, and Professor in Residence in 2007. When he left in 2010, Bonci was Professor in Residence in the Department of Neurology at the University of California, San Francisco (UCSF), the Howard J. Weinberg Endowed Chair in Addiction Research, and the Associate Director for Extramural Affairs at the Ernest Gallo Clinic and Research Center. In 2010, he was appointed as the Scientific Director of National Institute on Drug Abuse (NIDA). Bonci resigned from his position in August 2019 after a sexual misconduct probe was opened against him for allegedly "sexual targetting" a trainee as well as directing resources to another trainee with whom he had an intimate relationship.

Bonci is currently the President and Chief Scientific Officer at GIA Miami and Vita Recovery.

Research
Bonci is known for his studies on the long-term effects of drug exposure on the brain. Bonci's laboratory, in collaboration with Robert Malenka, was the first to demonstrate that drugs of abuse, such as cocaine, modify the strength of the connections between neurons. This finding cast a new light on the phenomenon of drug addiction, as a process where maladaptive learning plays a role. Subsequent studies have combined electrophysiological, optogenetic, molecular, and behavioral techniques to determine the long-term effects that are produced by chronic exposure to stress, cocaine or ethanol, with the goal of  creating novel therapeutic avenues to decrease the devastating effects of these conditions. In 2013, a study lead by Billy T. Chen, provided rationale for the use of non-invasive brain stimulation, such as repeated Transcranial Magnetic Stimulation, in patients with cocaine use disorders. Clinical studies have indeed shown the potential of such technology in the treatment of cocaine use disorders.; In Europe, publications by Dr. Bonci and collaborators have been used by the TMS company Mag Venture to obtain the European CE approval for treatment of addiction.

Publications (non-exhaustive list)

 Bonci A, Malenka RC. Properties and plasticity of excitatory synapses on dopaminergic and GABAergic cells in the ventral tegmental area. J Neurosci. 1999 May 15;19(10):3723-30. PubMed PMID 10234004.
 Thomas MJ, Malenka RC, Bonci A. Modulation of long-term depression by dopamine in the mesolimbic system. J Neurosci. 2000 Aug 1;20(15):5581-6. PubMed PMID 10908594.
 Ungless MA, Whistler JL, Malenka RC, Bonci A. Single cocaine exposure in vivo induces long-term potentiation in dopamine neurons. Nature. 2001 May 31;411(6837):583-7. PubMed PMID 11385572.
 Thomas MJ, Beurrier C, Bonci A, Malenka RC. Long-term depression in the nucleus accumbens: a neural correlate of behavioral sensitization to cocaine. Nat Neurosci. 2001 Dec;4(12):1217-23. PubMed PMID 11694884.
 Melis M, Camarini R, Ungless MA, Bonci A. Long-lasting potentiation of GABAergic synapses in dopamine neurons after a single in vivo ethanol exposure. J Neurosci. 2002 Mar 15;22(6):2074-82. PubMed PMID 11896147.
 Saal D, Dong Y, Bonci A, Malenka RC. Drugs of abuse and stress trigger a common synaptic adaptation in dopamine neurons. Neuron. 2003 Feb 20;37(4):577-82. Erratum in: Neuron. 2003 Apr 24;38(2):359. PubMed PMID 12597856.
 Hopf FW, Cascini MG, Gordon AS, Diamond I, Bonci A. Cooperative activation of dopamine D1 and D2 receptors increases spike firing of nucleus accumbens neurons via G-protein betagamma subunits. J Neurosci. 2003 Jun 15;23(12):5079-87. PubMed PMID 12832531.
 Ungless MA, Singh V, Crowder TL, Yaka R, Ron D, Bonci A. Corticotropin-releasing factor requires CRF binding protein to potentiate NMDA receptors via CRF receptor 2 in dopamine neurons. Neuron. 2003 Jul 31;39(3):401-7. PubMed PMID 12895416.
 Borgland SL, Malenka RC, Bonci A. Acute and chronic cocaine-induced potentiation of synaptic strength in the ventral tegmental area: electrophysiological and behavioral correlates in individual rats. J Neurosci. 2004 Aug 25;24(34):7482-90. PubMed PMID 15329395.
 Martin M, Chen BT, Hopf FW, Bowers MS, Bonci A. Cocaine self-administration selectively abolishes LTD in the core of the nucleus accumbens. Nat Neurosci. 2006 Jul;9(7):868-9. Epub 2006 May 28. PubMed PMID 16732275.
 Schilström B, Yaka R, Argilli E, Suvarna N, Schumann J, Chen BT, Carman M, Singh V, Mailliard WS, Ron D, Bonci A. Cocaine enhances NMDA receptor-mediated currents in ventral tegmental area cells via dopamine D5 receptor-dependent redistribution of NMDA receptors. J Neurosci. 2006 Aug 16;26(33):8549-58. Erratum in: J Neurosci. 2006 Sep 13;26(37):9604. PubMed PMID 16914681.
 Wanat MJ, Hopf FW, Stuber GD, Phillips PE, Bonci A. Corticotropin-releasing factor increases mouse ventral tegmental area dopamine neuron firing through a protein kinase C-dependent enhancement of Ih. J Physiol. 2008 Apr 15;586(Pt 8):2157-70. doi: 10.1113/jphysiol.2007.150078. Epub 2008 Feb 28. PubMed PMID 18308824; PubMed Central PMCID: PMC2465205.
 Chen BT, Bowers MS, Martin M, Hopf FW, Guillory AM, Carelli RM, Chou JK, Bonci A. Cocaine but not natural reward self-administration nor passive cocaine infusion produces persistent LTP in the VTA. Neuron. 2008 Jul 31;59(2):288-97. doi: 10.1016/j.neuron.2008.05.024. PubMed PMID 18667156; PubMed Central PMCID: PMC2593405.
 Argilli E, Sibley DR, Malenka RC, England PM, Bonci A. Mechanism and time course of cocaine-induced long-term potentiation in the ventral tegmental area. J Neurosci. 2008 Sep 10;28(37):9092-100. doi: 10.1523/JNEUROSCI.1001-08.2008. PubMed PMID 18784289; PubMed Central PMCID: PMC2586328.
 Stuber GD, Klanker M, de Ridder B, Bowers MS, Joosten RN, Feenstra MG, Bonci A. Reward-predictive cues enhance excitatory synaptic strength onto midbrain dopamine neurons. Science. 2008 Sep 19;321(5896):1690-2. doi: 10.1126/science.1160873. PubMed PMID 18802002; PubMed Central PMCID: PMC2613864.
 Wanat MJ, Sparta DR, Hopf FW, Bowers MS, Melis M, Bonci A. Strain specific synaptic modifications on ventral tegmental area dopamine neurons after ethanol exposure. Biol Psychiatry. 2009 Apr 15;65(8):646-53. doi: 10.1016/j.biopsych.2008.10.042. Epub 2008 Dec 31. PubMed PMID 19118821; PubMed Central PMCID: PMC3040034.
 Tsai HC, Zhang F, Adamantidis A, Stuber GD, Bonci A, de Lecea L, Deisseroth K. Phasic firing in dopaminergic neurons is sufficient for behavioral conditioning. Science. 2009 May 22;324(5930):1080-4. doi: 10.1126/science.1168878. Epub 2009 Apr 23. PubMed PMID 19389999.
 Borgland SL, Chang SJ, Bowers MS, Thompson JL, Vittoz N, Floresco SB, Chou J, Chen BT, Bonci A. Orexin A/hypocretin-1 selectively promotes motivation for positive reinforcers. J Neurosci. 2009 Sep 9;29(36):11215-25. doi: 10.1523/JNEUROSCI.6096-08.2009. PubMed PMID 19741128; PubMed Central PMCID: PMC2771749.
 Hopf FW, Bowers MS, Chang SJ, Chen BT, Martin M, Seif T, Cho SL, Tye K, Bonci A. Reduced nucleus accumbens SK channel activity enhances alcohol seeking during abstinence. Neuron. 2010 Mar 11;65(5):682-94. doi: 10.1016/j.neuron.2010.02.015. PubMed PMID 20223203; PubMed Central PMCID: PMC2847608.
 Tye KM, Tye LD, Cone JJ, Hekkelman EF, Janak PH, Bonci A. Methylphenidate facilitates learning-induced amygdala plasticity. Nat Neurosci. 2010 Apr;13(4):475-81. doi: 10.1038/nn.2506. Epub 2010 Mar 7. PubMed PMID 20208527; PubMed Central PMCID: PMC2988577.
 Bowers MS, Chen BT, Bonci A. AMPA receptor synaptic plasticity induced by psychostimulants: the past, present, and therapeutic future. Neuron. 2010 Jul 15;67(1):11-24. doi: 10.1016/j.neuron.2010.06.004. Review. PubMed PMID 20624588; PubMed Central PMCID: PMC2904302.
 Hopf FW, Simms JA, Chang SJ, Seif T, Bartlett SE, Bonci A. Chlorzoxazone, an SK-type potassium channel activator used in humans, reduces excessive alcohol intake in rats. Biol Psychiatry. 2011 Apr 1;69(7):618-24. doi: 10.1016/j.biopsych.2010.11.011. Epub 2010 Dec 31. PubMed PMID 21195386; PubMed Central PMCID: PMC3062269.
 Stuber GD, Sparta DR, Stamatakis AM, van Leeuwen WA, Hardjoprajitno JE, Cho S, Tye KM, Kempadoo KA, Zhang F, Deisseroth K, Bonci A. Excitatory transmission from the amygdala to nucleus accumbens facilitates reward seeking. Nature. 2011 Jun 29;475(7356):377-80. doi: 10.1038/nature10194. PubMed PMID 21716290; PubMed Central PMCID: PMC3775282.
 Kotowski SJ, Hopf FW, Seif T, Bonci A, von Zastrow M. Endocytosis promotes rapid dopaminergic signaling. Neuron. 2011 Jul 28;71(2):278-90. doi: 10.1016/j.neuron.2011.05.036. PubMed PMID 21791287; PubMed Central PMCID: PMC3417347.
 Güler AD, Rainwater A, Parker JG, Jones GL, Argilli E, Arenkiel BR, Ehlers MD, Bonci A, Zweifel LS, Palmiter RD. Transient activation of specific neurons in mice by selective expression of the capsaicin receptor. Nat Commun. 2012 Mar 20;3:746. doi: 10.1038/ncomms1749. PubMed PMID 22434189; PubMed Central PMCID: PMC3592340.
 Tai LH, Lee AM, Benavidez N, Bonci A, Wilbrecht L. Transient stimulation of distinct subpopulations of striatal neurons mimics changes in action value. Nat Neurosci. 2012 Sep;15(9):1281-9. doi: 10.1038/nn.3188. Epub 2012 Aug 19. PubMed PMID 22902719; PubMed Central PMCID: PMC3951287.
 Britt JP, Benaliouad F, McDevitt RA, Stuber GD, Wise RA, Bonci A. Synaptic and behavioral profile of multiple glutamatergic inputs to the nucleus accumbens. Neuron. 2012 Nov 21;76(4):790-803. doi: 10.1016/j.neuron.2012.09.040. PubMed PMID 23177963; PubMed Central PMCID: PMC3607383.
 Kourrich S, Su TP, Fujimoto M, Bonci A. The sigma-1 receptor: roles in neuronal plasticity and disease. Trends Neurosci. 2012 Dec;35(12):762-71. doi: 10.1016/j.tins.2012.09.007. Epub 2012 Oct 23. Review. PubMed PMID 23102998; PubMed Central PMCID: PMC3587126.
 Kourrich S, Hayashi T, Chuang JY, Tsai SY, Su TP, Bonci A. Dynamic interaction between sigma-1 receptor and Kv1.2 shapes neuronal and behavioral responses to cocaine. Cell. 2013 Jan 17;152(1-2):236-47. doi: 10.1016/j.cell.2012.12.004. PubMed PMID 23332758; PubMed Central PMCID: PMC4159768.
 Wanat MJ, Bonci A, Phillips PE. CRF acts in the midbrain to attenuate accumbens dopamine release to rewards but not their predictors. Nat Neurosci. 2013 Apr;16(4):383-5. doi: 10.1038/nn.3335. Epub 2013 Feb 17. PubMed PMID 23416448; PubMed Central PMCID: PMC3609940.
 Chen BT, Yau HJ, Hatch C, Kusumoto-Yoshida I, Cho SL, Hopf FW, Bonci A. Rescuing cocaine-induced prefrontal cortex hypoactivity prevents compulsive cocaine seeking. Nature. 2013 Apr 18;496(7445):359-62. doi: 10.1038/nature12024. Epub 2013 Apr 3. PubMed PMID 23552889.
 Kempadoo KA, Tourino C, Cho SL, Magnani F, Leinninger GM, Stuber GD, Zhang F, Myers MG, Deisseroth K, de Lecea L, Bonci A. Hypothalamic neurotensin projections promote reward by enhancing glutamate transmission in the VTA. J Neurosci. 2013 May 1;33(18):7618-26. doi: 10.1523/JNEUROSCI.2588-12.2013. PubMed PMID 23637156; PubMed Central PMCID: PMC3865559.
 Seif T, Chang SJ, Simms JA, Gibb SL, Dadgar J, Chen BT, Harvey BK, Ron D, Messing RO, Bonci A, Hopf FW. Cortical activation of accumbens hyperpolarization-active NMDARs mediates aversion-resistant alcohol intake. Nat Neurosci. 2013 Aug;16(8):1094-100. doi: 10.1038/nn.3445. Epub 2013 Jun 30. PubMed PMID 23817545; PubMed Central PMCID: PMC3939030.
 Britt JP, Bonci A. Alcohol and tobacco: how smoking may promote excessive drinking. Neuron. 2013 Aug 7;79(3):406-7. doi: 10.1016/j.neuron.2013.07.018. PubMed PMID 23931990; PubMed Central PMCID: PMC4130210.
 Takahashi YK, Chang CY, Lucantonio F, Haney RZ, Berg BA, Yau HJ, Bonci A, Schoenbaum G. Neural estimates of imagined outcomes in the orbitofrontal cortex drive behavior and learning. Neuron. 2013 Oct 16;80(2):507-18. doi: 10.1016/j.neuron.2013.08.008. PubMed PMID 24139047; PubMed Central PMCID: PMC3806218.
 Kumar V, Kim K, Joseph C, Kourrich S, Yoo SH, Huang HC, Vitaterna MH, de Villena FP, Churchill G, Bonci A, Takahashi JS. C57BL/6N mutation in cytoplasmic FMRP interacting protein 2 regulates cocaine response. Science. 2013 Dec 20;342(6165):1508-12. doi: 10.1126/science.1245503. PubMed PMID 24357318; PubMed Central PMCID: PMC4500108.
 Tejeda HA, Bonci A. Shedding "UV" light on endogenous opioid dependence. Cell. 2014 Jun 19;157(7):1500-1. doi: 10.1016/j.cell.2014.06.009. PubMed PMID 24949960.
 Lee AM, Hoy JL, Bonci A, Wilbrecht L, Stryker MP, Niell CM. Identification of a brainstem circuit regulating visual cortical state in parallel with locomotion. Neuron. 2014 Jul 16;83(2):455-66. doi: 10.1016/j.neuron.2014.06.031. PubMed PMID 25033185; PubMed Central PMCID: PMC4151326.
 McDevitt RA, Tiran-Cappello A, Shen H, Balderas I, Britt JP, Marino RA, Chung SL, Richie CT, Harvey BK, Bonci A. Serotonergic versus nonserotonergic dorsal raphe projection neurons: differential participation in reward circuitry. Cell Rep. 2014 Sep 25;8(6):1857-69. doi: 10.1016/j.celrep.2014.08.037. Epub 2014 Sep 18. PubMed PMID 25242321; PubMed Central PMCID: PMC4181379.
 Siniscalchi A, Bonci A, Mercuri NB, De Siena A, De Sarro G, Malferrari G, Diana M, Gallelli L. Cocaine dependence and stroke: pathogenesis and management. Curr Neurovasc Res. 2015;12(2):163-72. Review. PubMed PMID 25742568.
 Kusumoto-Yoshida I, Liu H, Chen BT, Fontanini A, Bonci A. Central role for the insular cortex in mediating conditioned responses to anticipatory cues. Proc Natl Acad Sci U S A. 2015 Jan 27;112(4):1190-5. doi: 10.1073/pnas.1416573112. Epub 2015 Jan 12. PubMed PMID 25583486; PubMed Central PMCID: PMC4313852.
 Kourrich S, Calu DJ, Bonci A. Intrinsic plasticity: an emerging player in addiction. Nat Rev Neurosci. 2015 Mar;16(3):173-84. doi: 10.1038/nrn3877. Review. PubMed PMID 25697160.
 Zhang S, Qi J, Li X, Wang HL, Britt JP, Hoffman AF, Bonci A, Lupica CR, Morales M. Dopaminergic and glutamatergic microdomains in a subset of rodent mesoaccumbens axons. Nat Neurosci. 2015 Mar;18(3):386-92. doi: 10.1038/nn.3945. Epub 2015 Feb 9. PubMed PMID 25664911; PubMed Central PMCID: PMC4340758
 Wang DV, Yau HJ, Broker CJ, Tsou JH, Bonci A, Ikemoto S. Mesopontine median raphe regulates hippocampal ripple oscillation and memory consolidation. Nat Neurosci. 2015 May;18(5):728-35. doi: 10.1038/nn.3998. Epub 2015 Apr 13. PubMed PMID 25867120; PubMed Central PMCID: PMC4414896.
 Pignatelli M, Bonci A. Role of Dopamine Neurons in Reward and Aversion: A Synaptic Plasticity Perspective. Neuron. 2015 Jun 3;86(5):1145-57. doi: 10.1016/j.neuron.2015.04.015. Review. PubMed PMID 26050034.
 Zhang F, Tsai HC, Airan RD, Stuber GD, Adamantidis AR, de Lecea L, Bonci A, Deisseroth K. Optogenetics in Freely Moving Mammals: Dopamine and Reward. Cold Spring Harb Protoc. 2015 Aug 3;2015(8):715-24. doi: 10.1101/pdb.top086330. PubMed PMID 26240415.
 Adamantidis A, Arber S, Bains JS, Bamberg E, Bonci A, Buzsáki G, Cardin JA, Costa RM, Dan Y, Goda Y, Graybiel AM, Häusser M, Hegemann P, Huguenard JR, Insel TR, * Janak PH, Johnston D, Josselyn SA, Koch C, Kreitzer AC, Lüscher C, Malenka RC, Miesenböck G, Nagel G, Roska B, Schnitzer MJ, Shenoy KV, Soltesz I, Sternson SM, * * Tsien RW, Tsien RY, Turrigiano GG, Tye KM, Wilson RI. Optogenetics: 10 years after ChR2 in neurons—views from the community. Nat Neurosci. 2015 Sep;18(9):1202-12. doi: 10.1038/nn.4106. Review. PubMed PMID 26308981.
 Tsai SY, Chuang JY, Tsai MS, Wang XF, Xi ZX, Hung JJ, Chang WC, Bonci A, Su TP. Sigma-1 receptor mediates cocaine-induced transcriptional regulation by recruiting chromatin-remodeling factors at the nuclear envelope. Proc Natl Acad Sci U S A. 2015 Nov 24;112(47):E6562-70. doi: 10.1073/pnas.1518894112. Epub 2015 Nov 9. PubMed PMID 26554014; PubMed Central PMCID: PMC4664336.
 Siniscalchi A, Bonci A, Biagio Mercuri N, Pirritano D, Squillace A, De Sarro G, Gallelli L. The Role of Topiramate in the Management of Cocaine Addiction: a Possible Therapeutic Option. Curr Neuropharmacol. 2015 Nov 26;13(6):815-8. PubMed PMID 26630959.
 Whitaker LR, Carneiro de Oliveira PE, McPherson KB, Fallon RV, Planeta CS, Bonci A, Hope BT. Associative Learning Drives the Formation of Silent Synapses in Neuronal Ensembles of the Nucleus Accumbens. Biol Psychiatry. 2016 Aug 1;80(3):246-56. doi: 10.1016/j.biopsych.2015.08.006. PubMed PMID 26386479
 Terraneo A, Leggio L, Saladini M, Ermani M, Bonci A*, Gallimberti L. Transcranial magnetic stimulation of dorsolateral prefrontal cortex reduces cocaine use: A pilot study. Eur Neuropsychopharmacol. 2016 Jan;26(1):37-44. doi: 10.1016/j.euroneuro.2015.11.011. Epub 2015 Dec 4. PubMed PMID 26655188. *Corresponding author
 Belin-Rauscent A, Fouyssac M, Bonci A, Belin D. How Preclinical Models Evolved to Resemble the Diagnostic Criteria of Drug Addiction. Biol Psychiatry. 2016 Jan 1;79(1):39-46. doi: 10.1016/j.biopsych.2015.01.004. Epub 2015 Jan 29. Review. PubMed PMID 25747744.
 Chang CY, Esber GR, Marrero-Garcia Y, Yau HJ, Bonci A, Schoenbaum G. Brief optogenetic inhibition of dopamine neurons mimics endogenous negative reward prediction errors. Nat Neurosci. 2016 Jan;19(1):111-6. doi: 10.1038/nn.4191. Epub 2015 Dec 7. PubMed PMID 26642092; PubMed Central PMCID: PMC4696902.
 Roseberry TK, Lee AM, Lalive AL, Wilbrecht L, Bonci A, Kreitzer AC. Cell-Type-Specific Control of Brainstem Locomotor Circuits by Basal Ganglia. Cell. 2016 Jan 28;164(3):526-37. doi: 10.1016/j.cell.2015.12.037. PubMed PMID 26824660.
 Marchant NJ, Campbell EJ, Whitaker LR, Harvey BK, Kaganovsky K, Adhikary S, Hope BT, Heins RC, Prisinzano TE, Vardy E, Bonci A, Bossert JM, Shaham Y. Role of Ventral Subiculum in Context-Induced Relapse to Alcohol Seeking after Punishment-Imposed Abstinence. J Neurosci. 2016 Mar 16;36(11):3281-94. doi: 10.1523/JNEUROSCI.4299-15.2016. PubMed PMID 26985037.
 Zhang HY, Gao M, Shen H, Bi GH, Yang HJ, Liu QR, Wu J, Gardner EL, Bonci A, Xi ZX. Expression of functional cannabinoid CB2 receptor in VTA dopamine neurons in rats. Addict Biol. 2016 Feb 1. doi: 10.1111/adb.12367. [Epub ahead of print] PubMed PMID 26833913.
 Siniscalchi A, Sztajzel R, Bonci A, Malferrari G, De Sarro G, Gallelli L. Editorial: Cocaine and Cerebral Small Vessel: Is it a Negative Factor for Intravenous Thrombolysis? Curr Vasc Pharmacol. 2016 Feb 4;14(3):304-6. PubMed PMID 26845684.
 Yau HJ, Wang DV, Tsou JH, Chuang YF, Chen BT, Deisseroth K, Ikemoto S, Bonci A. Pontomesencephalic Tegmental Afferents to VTA Non-dopamine Neurons Are Necessary for Appetitive Pavlovian Learning. Cell Rep. 2016 Sep 6;16(10):2699-710. doi: 10.1016/j.celrep.2016.08.007. Epub 2016 Aug 25. PubMed PMID 27568569.
 Haass-Koffler CL, Henry AT, Melkus G, Simms JA, Naemmuddin M, Nielsen CK, Lasek AW, Magill M, Schwandt ML, Momenan R, Hodgkinson CA, Bartlett SE, Swift RM, Bonci A, Leggio L. Defining the role of corticotropin releasing factor binding protein in alcohol consumption. Transl psychiatry. 2016 Nov 15; 6(11):e953. PubMed PMID 27845775
 Tejeda HA, Wu J, Kornspun A, Pignatelli M, Kashtelyan V, Krashes MJ, Lowell BB, Carlezon WA, Bonci A. Pathway- and Cell-Specific Kappa-Opioid Receptor Modulation of Excitation-Inhibition Balance Differentially Gates D1 and D2 Accumbens Neuron Activity. Neuron. 2017 Jan 4;93(1):147-163. PubMed PMID 28056342.
 Edwards NJ, Tejeda HA, Pignatelli M, Zhang S, McDevitt RA, Wu J, Bass CE, Bettler B, Morales M, Bonci A. Circuit specificity in the inhibitory architecture of the VTA regulates cocaine-induced behavior. Nat Neurosci. 2017 Jan 23. doi: 10.1038/nn.4482. [Epub ahead of print] PubMed PMID 28114294.
 Pignatelli M, Umanah G, Riberio SP, Chen R, Yau HJ, Dawson VL, Dawson TM, Bonci A. Synaptic Plasticity onto Dopamine Neurons Shapes Fear Learning. Neuron. 2017 Jan 18;93(2):425-440. PubMed PMID 28103482.
 De Biase LM, Schuebel KE, Fusfeld ZH, Jair K, Hawes IA, Cimbro R, Zhang HY, Liu QR, Shen H, Xi ZX, Goldman D, Bonci A. Local Cues Establish and Maintain Region-Specific Phenotypes of Basal Ganglia Microglia. Neuron. 2017 Jul 19;95(2):341-356.e6. doi: 10.1016/j.neuron.2017.06.020. Epub 2017 Jul 6. PubMed PMID 28689984.
 Gomez JL, Bonaventura J, Lesniak W, Mathews WB, Sysa-Shah P, Rodriguez LA, Ellis RJ, Richie CT, Harvey BK, Dannals RF, Pomper MG, Bonci A, Michaelides M. Chemogenetics revealed: DREADD occupancy and activation via converted clozapine. Science. 2017 Aug 4;357(6350):503-507. doi: 10.1126/science.aan2475. PubMed PMID 28774929.
 Diana M, Raij T, Melis M, Nummenmaa A, Leggio L, Bonci A. Rehabilitating the addicted brain with transcranial magnetic stimulation. Nat Rev Neurosci. 2017 Nov;18(11):685-693. doi: 10.1038/nrn.2017.113. Epub 2017 Sep 29. Review. PubMed PMID 28951609.
 Umanah GKE, Pignatelli M, Yin X, Chen R, Crawford J, Neifert S, Scarffe L, Behensky AA, Guiberson N, Chang M, Ma E, Kim JW, Castro CC, Mao X, Chen L, Andrabi SA, * Pletnikov MV, Pulver AE, Avramopoulos D, Bonci A, Valle D, Dawson TM, Dawson VL. Thorase variants are associated with defects in glutamatergic neurotransmission that can be rescued by Perampanel. Sci Transl Med. 2017 Dec 13;9(420). pii: eaah4985. doi: 10.1126/scitranslmed.aah4985. PubMed PMID 29237760.
 Pignatelli M, Bonci A. Spiraling Connectivity of NAc-VTA Circuitry. Neuron. 2018 Jan 17;97(2):261-262. doi: 10.1016/j.neuron.2017.12.046. PubMed PMID 29346748.
 Yano H, Cai NS, Xu M, Verma RK, Rea W, Hoffman AF, Shi L, Javitch JA, Bonci A, Ferré S. Gs- versus Golf-dependent functional selectivity mediated by the dopamine D1 receptor. Nat Commun. 2018 Feb 5;9(1):486. doi: 10.1038/s41467-017-02606-w. PubMed PMID 29402888; PubMed Central PMCID: PMC5799184.
 Pettorruso M, Spagnolo PA, Leggio L, Janiri L, Di Giannantonio M, Gallimberti L, Bonci A, Martinotti G. Repetitive transcranial magnetic stimulation of the left dorsolateral prefrontal cortex may improve symptoms of anhedonia in individuals with cocaine use disorder: A pilot study. Brain Stimul. 2018 Jun 5. pii: S1935-861X(18)30165-7. doi: 10.1016/j.brs.2018.06.001. PubMed PMID 29885861.
 Xin W, Schuebel KE, Jair KW, Cimbro R, De Biase LM, Goldman D, Bonci A. Ventral midbrain astrocytes display unique physiological features and sensitivity to dopamine D2 receptor signaling. Neuropsychopharmacology. 2018 Jul 13. doi: 10.1038/s41386-018-0151-4. PubMed PMID 30054584.
 Shen H, Marino RAM, McDevitt RA, Bi GH, Chen K, Madeo G, Lee PT, Liang Y, De Biase LM, Su TP, et al. Genetic deletion of vesicular glutamate transporter in dopamine neurons increases vulnerability to MPTP-induced neurotoxicity in mice. Proc Natl Acad Sci U S A. 2018 Nov 15. pii: 201800886. doi: 10.1073/pnas.1800886115. PubMed PMID 30442663.
 Spagnolo PA, Gómez Pérez LJ, Terraneo A, Gallimberti L, Bonci A. Neural Correlates of Cue- and Stress-induced Craving in Gambling Disorders: Implications for Transcranial Magnetic Stimulation Interventions. Eur J Neurosci. 2018 Dec 21. doi: 10.1111/ejn.14313. PubMed PMID 30575160.
 Hu Y, Salmeron BJ, Krasnova IN, Gu H, Lu H, Bonci A, Cadet JL, Stein EA Yang Y. Compulsive Drug Use is Associated with Imbalance of Orbitofrontal- and Prelimbic- Striatal Circuits in Punishment-Resistant Individuals. PNAS 2018 Dec 4;115(49): E11532-E11541. doi: 10.1073.
 Xin W, Mironova YA, Shen H, Marino RAM, Waisman A, Lamers WH, Bergles DE, Bonci A. Oligodendrocytes support neuronal glutamatergic transmission via expression of glutamine synthetase, Cell Reports 2019 May 21;27(8):2262-2271.e5. doi: 10.1016.
 Cardullo S, Gomez Perez LJ, Marconi L, Terraneo A, Gallimberti L, Bonci A, Madeo G. Clinical Improvements in Comorbid Gambling/Cocaine Use Disorder (GD/CUD) Patients Undergoing Repetitive Transcranial Magnetic Stimulation (rTMS). J Clin Med. 2019 May 30;8(6). doi: 10.3390/jcm8060768.
 Francis TC, Yano H, Demarest TG, Shen H, Bonci A. High Frequency Activation of Nucleus Accumbens D1-MSNs Drives Excitatory Potentiation on D2-MSNs. Neuron. 2019 Aug 7;103(3):432-444.e3. doi: 10.1016.
 Ekhtiari H, Tavakoli H, Addolorato G, Baeken C, Bonci A, Campanella S, Castelo-Branco L, Challet-Bouju G, Clark VP, Claus E, Dannon PN, Del Felice A, den Uyl T, Diana M, di Giannantonio M, Fedota JR, Fitzgerald P, Gallimberti L, Grall-Bronnec M, Herremans SC, Herrmann MJ, Jamil A, Khedr E, Kouimtsidis C, Kozak K, Krupitsky E, Lamm C, Lechner WV, Madeo G, Malmir N, Martinotti G, McDonald WM, Montemitro C, Nakamura-Palacios EM, Nasehi M, Noël X, Nosratabadi M, Paulus M, Pettorruso M, Pradhan B, Praharaj SK, Rafferty H, Sahlem G, Salmeron BJ, Sauvaget A, Schluter RS, Sergiou C, Shahbabaie A, Sheffer C, Spagnolo PA, Steele VR, Yuan TF, van Dongen JDM, Van Waes V, Venkatasubramanian G, Verdejo-García A, Verveer I, Welsh JW, Wesley MJ, Witkiewitz K, Yavari F, Zarrindast MR, Zawertailo L, Zhang X, Cha YH, George TP, Frohlich F, Goudriaan AE, Fecteau S, Daughters SB, Stein EA, Fregni F, Nitsche MA, Zangen A, Bikson M, Hanlon CA. Transcranial electrical and magnetic stimulation (tES and TMS) for addiction medicine: A consensus paper on the present state of the science and the road ahead. Neurosci Biobehav Rev. 2019 Sep;104:118-140. doi: 10.1016/j.neubiorev.2019.06.007. PMID 31271802.
 Bonaventura J, Eldridge MAG, Hu F, Gomez JL, Sanchez-Soto M, Abramyan AM, Lam S, Boehm MA, Ruiz C, Farrell MR, Moreno A, Galal Faress IM, Andersen N, Lin JY, Moaddel R, Morris PJ, Shi L, Sibley DR, Mahler SV, Nabavi S, Pomper MG, Bonci A, Horti AG, Richmond BJ, Michaelides M. High-potency ligands for DREADD imaging and activation in rodents and monkeys. Nat Commun. 2019 Oct 11;10(1):4627. doi: 10.1038/s41467-019-12236-z. PMCID: PMC6788984.
 Pettorruso M, Martinotti G, Montemitro C, De Risio L, Spagnolo PA, Gallimberti L, Fanella F, Bonci A, Di Giannantonio M; Brainswitch Study Group. Multiple Sessions of High-Frequency Repetitive Transcranial Magnetic Stimulation as a Potential Treatment for Gambling Addiction: A 3-Month, Feasibility Study. Eur Addict Res. 2019 Oct 30:1-5. doi: 10.1159/000504169. PMID 31665732.
 Madeo G, Terraneo A, Cardullo S, Gómez Pérez LJ, Cellini N, Sarlo M, Bonci A, Gallimberti L. Long-Term Outcome of Repetitive Transcranial Magnetic Stimulation in a Large Cohort of Patients With Cocaine-Use Disorder: An Observational Study. Front Psychiatry. 2020 Feb 28;11:158. doi: 10.3389/fpsyt.2020.00158.
 Pignatelli M, Tejeda HA, Barker DJ, Bontempi L, Wu J, Lopez A, Palma Ribeiro S, Lucantonio F, Parise EM, Torres-Berrio A, Alvarez-Bagnarol Y, Marino RAM, Cai ZL, Xue M, Morales M, Tamminga CA, Nestler EJ, Bonci A. Cooperative synaptic and intrinsic plasticity in a disynaptic limbic circuit drive stress-induced anhedonia and passive coping in mice. Mol Psychiatry. 2020 Mar 11. doi: 10.1038/s41380-020-0686-8.
 Gil-Lievana E, Balderas I, Moreno-Castilla P, Luis-Islas J, McDevitt RA, Tecuapetla F, Gutierrez R, Bonci A, Bermudez-Rattoni F. Glutamatergic basolateral amygdala to anterior insular cortex circuitry maintains rewarding contextual memory. Commun Biol. 2020 Mar 20;3(1):139. doi: 10.1038/s42003-020-0862-z.
 Marino RAM, McDevitt RA, Gantz SC, Shen H, Pignatelli M, Xin W, Wise RA, Bonci A. Control of food approach and eating by a GABAergic projection from lateral hypothalamus to dorsal pons. Proc Natl Acad Sci U S A. 2020 Mar 30. doi: 10.1073/pnas.1909340117.
 Gómez Pérez LJ, Cardullo S, Cellini N, Sarlo M, Monteanni T, Bonci A, Terraneo A, Gallimberti L, Madeo G. Sleep quality improves during treatment with Repetitive Transcranial Magnetic Stimulation (rTMS) in patients with cocaine use disorder: A retrospective observational study. BMC Psychiatry. 2020 Apr 6;20(1):153. doi: 10.1186/s12888-020-02568-2.

Awards and honors

October, 2004 - Jacob P. Waletzky Memorial Award 

December, 2009 - Daniel H. Efron Award at the American College of Neuropsychopharmacology

February 6, 2014 - Officer of the Order of the Star of Italy.

November, 2015 - PrimiDieci USA 

July, 2016 - Federation of European Neuroscience Societies and European Journal of Neuroscience Award.

October, 2016 - Member of the National Academy of Medicine

References

External links
 

1966 births
Living people
Italian emigrants to the United States
American neuroscientists
Neuropsychologists
University of California, San Francisco faculty
National Institutes of Health people
21st-century American scientists
21st-century American physicians
21st-century Italian scientists
21st-century Italian physicians
Università Cattolica del Sacro Cuore alumni
Italian neurologists
Members of the National Academy of Medicine